Tetraonchoididae is a family of flatworms belonging to the order Gyrodactylidea.

Genera:
 Allotetraonchoides Dillon & Hargis, 1968
 Heteropavlovskioides Machida, 1978
 Neopavlovskioides Dillon & Hargis, 1968
 Paratetraonchoides Bychowsky, Gussev & Nagibina, 1965
 Pavlovskioides Bychowsky, Gussev & Nagibina, 1965
 Pseudotetraonchoides Bychowsky, Gussev & Nagibina, 1965
 Tetraonchoides Bychowsky, 1951

References

Platyhelminthes